Hiralal Jairam (12 November 1933 – 25 June 2018) was a South African cricketer. He played in eight first-class matches for Transvaal from 1971/72 to 1973/74. Originally from India, Jairam moved to Johannesburg in 1942. However, due to the Group Areas Act, his family was forced to move, before settling in Lenasia.

References

External links
 

1933 births
2018 deaths
South African cricketers
Gauteng cricketers
People from Navsari district
Cricketers from Gujarat